Knut Sandengen (26 May 1932 – 8 February 1969) was a Norwegian footballer. He played in four matches for the Norway national football team in 1956.

References

External links
 

1932 births
1969 deaths
Norwegian footballers
Norway international footballers
Place of birth missing
Association footballers not categorized by position